Manglerud is a borough in the Østensjø district of Oslo, Norway. Manglerud was built in the 1960s as a suburb to Oslo, connected by the Oslo T-bane metro system.

Sport

Ice hockey

The suburb is perhaps most known for its ice hockey team, Manglerud Star, which plays in the GET-ligaen, the highest level of Norwegian hockey. They are two times Norwegian champions, in 1977 and in 1978.

Notable people 
 Paul Waaktaar-Savoy, member of the Norwegian band a-ha
 Magne Furuholmen, member of the Norwegian band a-ha
 Marius Müller, musician

Neighbourhoods of Oslo